3 is the third studio album by American hard rock band FireHouse. It was released in 1995 on Epic Records. It featured a softer sound than their previous two albums, although unlike many glam metal bands at that time, Firehouse did not change its original glam metal sound despite the domination of grunge rock and alternative rock in the mainstream music industry by the time of the album's release.

Despite the album not selling as well as previous releases, it spawned the hit signature power ballad in "I Live My Life for You." It reached 26 on the Billboard Top 100, and was certified gold in other countries.

The band toured extensively in Asia, Argentina, Brazil and in smaller venues in the United States to support the album

Track listing 
All songs written by Bill Leverty and C.J. Snare.

 "Love Is a Dangerous Thing" – 4:46
 "What's Wrong" – 4:32
 "Somethin' 'Bout Your Body" – 4:43
 "Trying to Make a Living" – 4:26
 "Here for You" – 3:54
 "Get a Life" – 4:21
 "Two Sides" – 4:25
 "No One at All" – 3:36
 "Temptation" – 4:28
 "I Live My Life for You" – 4:24

Singles 
"I Live My Life for You" #26 U.S.
"Here for You" #108 U.S. (Bubbling Under Hot 100)

Personnel 
C.J. Snare – vocals, keyboards, additional bass
Bill Leverty – guitars
Perry Richardson – bass
Michael Foster – drums

Production 
Produced & engineered by Ron Nevison
Assistant engineers: Shawn Berman, Steve Gallagher (also served as mix assistant)
Mixing: Chris Lord-Alge
Mastering: Doug Sax

References 

FireHouse (band) albums
1995 albums
Epic Records albums
Albums produced by Ron Nevison